Nikolay Georgiyevich Ozolin (2 November 1906 – 25 June 2000) was a Russian pole vaulter who won a silver medal at the 1946 European Championships. He retired in 1950 and later had a long career as an athletics coach. Between 1954 and 1962 he headed the Russian research institute of sport and physical education. In 1970 he defended a habilitation in pedagogy and later supervised 7 habilitation and more than 50 PhD theses in sport-related topics. His trainees included Leonid Shcherbakov.

References

1906 births
2000 deaths
People from Goleniów County
Sportspeople from West Pomeranian Voivodeship
Russian male pole vaulters
Soviet male pole vaulters
European Athletics Championships medalists